Coyote Gulch is a tributary of the Escalante River, located in Garfield and Kane Counties in southern Utah, in the western United States. The upper sections of Coyote Gulch are located within the Grand Staircase–Escalante National Monument, while its lower sections are located in the Glen Canyon National Recreation Area.

The headwaters of Coyote Gulch have their origins along a  segment of the Straight Cliffs Formation which is the eastern edge of the Kaiparowits Plateau. Intermittent streams flowing down the Straight Cliffs merge to form larger branches, including Dry Fork, Big Hollow, the main branch of Coyote Gulch, and Hurricane Wash.

Canyon access

The main canyon of Coyote Gulch can be accessed by one of several trailheads located along the Hole-in-the-Rock Road (HITRR). The Red Well trailhead is at the end of a short spur road off the HITRR, and leads into the main channel near its junction with Big Hollow Wash. The trail into Hurricane Wash starts just off the HITRR. A trailhead located near some stock watering tanks along Fortymile Ridge Roadanother spur of the HITRRcan be used for a cross-country route to the middle of Coyote Gulch. This route involves a rather steep climb over slick rock. A trailhead at the end of the Fortymile Ridge Road leads to the junction of Coyote Gulch, the Escalante River, and Stevens Canyon.

Features
The sandy streambed of Coyote Gulch, typically just a few inches/centimeters deep, provides a path for wading through the trees and vegetation lining the bottom of the canyon. Near the middle of the main canyon's length is Jacob Hamblin Archalso known as Lobo Archwhich is large enough to reach under an overhang on the opposite side of the canyon. Further downstream within the canyon is Coyote Natural Bridge a small hole carved in a large sandstone fin. Still further downstream is Cliff Arch, a jug-handle style arch in the north wall of the canyon.

There are also numerous small waterfalls and cascades in the canyon between Jacob Hamblin Arch and the confluence with the Escalante River. Some of these waterfalls can be easily climbed, but others must be bypassed.

Dry Fork

The northernmost branch of Coyote Gulchcalled the Dry Forkis one of the most popular destinations in the area. A short spur road leads off from the Hole-in-the-Rock Road to a trailhead above the wash. A brief descent to the canyon floor leads to several tributary slot canyons. The Dry Fork is an excellent example of how occasional flash floods over long periods of time have carved narrow grooves into the Navajo Sandstone. Just downstream from the mouth of the Dry Fork is Peekaboo Gulch which has carved an even narrower channel into the sandstone, leading to a tube that empties into the dry wash of the main streambed. Finally, even further downstream in the main wash, Brimstone Gulch is the last named slot canyon in the Dry Fork area and is even narrower than Spooky Gulch, eventually reaching a width that is impassable to all hikers except animals smaller than mice and insects.

Gallery

See also

 List of canyons and gorges in Utah
 List of rivers of Utah

References

Further reading 
 "Hiking the Escalante", by Rudi Lambrechtse (1985), 
 "Canyon Hiking Guide to the Colorado Plateau", by Michael R. Kelsey (1995), 
 "Canyoneering 3: Loop Hikes in Utah's Escalante"' by Steve Allen (1997),

External links 

 BLM info for Coyote Gulch
 Grand Staircase-Escalante National Monument
 TopoQuest Map
 The Dry Fork of Coyote Gulch

Canyons and gorges of Utah
Rivers of Utah
Tributaries of the Colorado River in Utah
Grand Staircase–Escalante National Monument
Glen Canyon National Recreation Area
Rivers of Garfield County, Utah
Rivers of Kane County, Utah
Geologic formations of Utah
Geologic formations with imbedded sand dunes